The Hungarian Parliament Building (which translates to "House of the Country" or "House of the Nation"), also known as the Parliament of Budapest after its location, is the seat of the National Assembly of Hungary, a notable landmark of Hungary, and a popular tourist destination in Budapest. It is situated on Kossuth Square in the Pest side of the city, on the eastern bank of the Danube. It was designed by Hungarian architect Imre Steindl in neo-Gothic style and opened in 1902. It has been the largest building in Hungary since its completion.

History

Budapest was united from three cities in 1873, namely Buda, Óbuda, and Pest. Seven years later the Diet resolved to establish a new, representative parliament building, expressing the sovereignty of the nation. The building was planned to face the Danube River. An international competition was held, and Imre Steindl emerged as the victor; the plans of two other competitors were later also realized in the form of the Ethnographic Museum and the Hungarian Ministry of Agriculture, both facing the Parliament Building. Construction from the winning plan was started in 1885, and the building was inaugurated on the presumed 1,000th anniversary of the country in 1896. The keys to the building being handed over in 1902, however, It was not fully completed until 1904. The architect of the building first went blind and then later, died before its completion.

Since World War II the legislature became unicameral, and today the government uses only a small portion of the building. During the People's Republic of Hungary a red star perched on the top of the dome, but it was removed in 1990 after the fall of communism. Mátyás Szűrös declared the Hungarian Republic from the balcony facing Kossuth Lajos Square on 23 October 1989.

Features

The Parliament Building is built in the Gothic Revival style; it has a symmetrical façade and a central dome. The dome is Renaissance Revival architecture. The parliament is also largely symmetrical from the inside, with two identical parliament halls on the opposing sides of the building. One of the two halls is still in use today for sessions of the Hungarian National Assembly, the other for ceremonies, conferences, and guided tours. Its interior includes 10 courtyards, 13 passenger and freight elevators, 27 gates, 29 staircases and 691 rooms (which includes more than 200 offices). The number 96 refers to the nation's millennium, 1896, and the conquest of the later Kingdom of Hungary in 896. It is free to enter before 8 am.

The main façade overlooks the River Danube, but the official main entrance is from the square on the east side of the building. Inside and outside, there are altogether 242 sculptures on the walls. The façade displays statues of Hungarian rulers, Transylvanian leaders, and famous military figures. The coats of arms of kings and dukes are depicted over the windows. The eastern staircase is flanked by two lions. When entering the Parliament, visitors can walk up great ornamental stairs, see frescoes on the ceiling, and pass by the bust of the architect, Imre Steindl, in a wall niche. Other statues include those of Árpád, Stephen I and John Hunyadi. The building features stained glass and glass mosaics by Miksa Róth.

One of the famous parts of the building is the hexadecagonal (sixteen-sided) central hall, with huge chambers adjoining it: the Lower House and the Upper House. The modern National Assembly is unicameral and meets in the Lower House, while the Upper House is used as a conference and meeting room. The Holy Crown of Hungary, which is also depicted in the coat of arms of Hungary, has been displayed in the central hall since 2000. Due to its extensive surface and detailed handiwork, the building is almost always under renovation.

Accessibility and neighbourhood

The Parliament is accessible with Line 2 of the Budapest Metro and with tram line 2, from the Kossuth Lajos Square station.
At the east front of the building is a memorial to the 1956 Hungarian Revolution, as well as the imposing Kossuth Memorial and the equestrian statue of Francis II Rákóczi. A seated statue of Attila József as described in his poem By the Danube occupies a site on the south lawn. Martyrs' Square (Vértanúk tere) is immediately adjacent to Kossuth Square, with a statue of Imre Nagy.

Postage stamps
The building features on more than 50 postage stamps issued by Hungary during 1917–1921. Some of them are: In 1917, 1919, 15 April 1920, and 1921.

Gallery

Interior

Exterior

Stamps

References

Parliament site
House of the Nation: Information system of the Hungarian National Assembly
Assembly hall for 199 and formerly 386 Members of Parliament

External links

Parliament site
House of the Nation: Information system of the Hungarian National Assembly
Assembly hall for 199 and formerly 386 Members of Parliament

Parliament
Parliament
Hungary
Buildings and structures completed in 1904
Seats of national legislatures
Landmarks in Hungary
Government buildings with domes